Rochester railway station is located on the Deniliquin line in Victoria, Australia. It serves the town of Rochester, and opened on 19 September 1864.

A disused goods shed is located opposite the platform.

The disused Strathallan railway station is located between Rochester and Echuca.

Platforms and services
Rochester has one platform. It is served by V/Line Echuca line trains.

Platform 1:
 services to Southern Cross and Echuca

Transport links
Rochester is also served by V/Line road coaches running between Bendigo and Moama.

References

External links
Victorian Railway Stations gallery
Melway map at street-directory.com.au

Regional railway stations in Victoria (Australia)